"Bradbury House" can refer to:
Bradbury House (Los Angeles, California), a Spanish Colonial Revival adobe residence in Santa Monica, California, built c. 1922 from a design by John Byers.
 A dormitory at The University of Chicago.